Peter Soyer Beagle (born April 20, 1939) is an American novelist and screenwriter, especially of fantasy fiction. His best-known work is The Last Unicorn (1968), a fantasy novel he wrote in his twenties, which Locus subscribers voted the number five "All-Time Best Fantasy Novel" in 1987. During the last twenty-five years he has won several literary awards, including a World Fantasy Award for Life Achievement in 2011. He was named Damon Knight Memorial Grand Master by SFWA in 2018.

Early life
Beagle was born in Manhattan on April 20, 1939, the son of Rebecca Soyer and Simon Beagle. Three of his uncles were noted painters: Moses, Raphael, and Isaac Soyer.

Beagle has said that The Wind in the Willows, a classic of children's literature by Kenneth Grahame, originally attracted him to the genre of fantasy.

Career
Beagle was raised in Bronx, New York, and graduated from the Bronx High School of Science in 1955. He garnered early recognition from The Scholastic Art & Writing Awards, winning a scholarship to University of Pittsburgh for a poem he submitted as a high school senior. He went on to graduate from the university with a degree in creative writing. Following a year overseas, Beagle held the graduate Stegner Fellowship in creative writing at Stanford University, where he overlapped with Ken Kesey, Gurney Norman, and Larry McMurtry.

Beagle wrote his first novel, A Fine and Private Place, when he was only 19 years old, following it with a memoir, I See by My Outfit, in 1965. Today he is best known as the author of The Last Unicorn and A Fine and Private Place, as well as his later fantasies following The Folk of the Air.

In the 1970s, Beagle turned to screenwriting. After writing an introduction for an American print edition of The Lord of the Rings, he co-wrote the screenplay for the 1978 Ralph Bakshi-animated version of The Lord of the Rings. Two decades later he wrote the teleplay for "Sarek", episode 71 of the television series Star Trek: The Next Generation.

Beagle's work as a screenwriter interrupted his early career direction as a novelist, magazine nonfiction author, and short-story writer. But in the mid-'90s he returned to prose fiction of all lengths, and has produced new works at a steady pace since. With David Carlson as composer he adapted his story "Come, Lady Death" into the libretto for an opera, The Midnight Angel, which premiered at the Opera Theater of St. Louis in 1993.

In 2005, Beagle published a coda to The Last Unicorn, a novelette entitled Two Hearts, and began work on a full-novel sequel. Two Hearts won the most prestigious annual awards, the Hugo Award for Best Novelette in 2006 and the parallel Nebula Award in 2007. It was also nominated as a short fiction finalist for the World Fantasy Award. Beagle also received a special Inkpot Award in 2006 for Outstanding Achievement in Science Fiction and Fantasy, and in 2007 the inaugural WSFA Small Press Award for "El Regalo", published in The Line Between (Tachyon Publications).

IDW Publishing released a six-issue comic book adaptation of The Last Unicorn beginning in April 2010. The collected hardcover edition was released in January 2011, premiering at #2 on the New York Times Hardcover Graphic Novel bestseller list. 

Beagle's 2009 collection of short fiction, We Never Talk About My Brother, was nominated for a World Fantasy Award.

In 2013, he collaborated with Phildel (a UK musician) on a new track "Dark Water Down", mixing poetry and music. They then appeared together at a gig at Cafe Du Nord in San Francisco.

Dispute with Granada media
Peter S. Beagle's book The Last Unicorn was made into an animated film of the same name in 1982, based on a screenplay written by Beagle himself. In 1979, Beagle had a contract with ITC Entertainment, which entitled Beagle to 5% of the net profits in the animated property, and 5% of the gross revenues from any film-related merchandising. Since 1999 this film has been controlled by a British company, Granada Media International (a subsidiary of ITV plc). From 2003 through 2011, Beagle was involved in a financial dispute with Granada over nonpayment of contractually due profit and merchandising shares. On July 29, 2011, Beagle announced at his Otakon appearance that he and ITV had reached an agreement that was beneficial to all parties, and should please fans of The Last Unicorn. On October 14, 2011, at his New York Comic Con appearance, he announced the first results of the deal.

Dispute with Connor Cochran
Beagle sued his former manager Connor Cochran in 2015 for $52 million. Beagle was represented by Kathleen Hunt. In July 2019, in a seventeen page decision, Alameda County Superior Court judge Michael M. Markman found Cochran liable for financial elder abuse, fraud, and breach of fiduciary duty, awarding Beagle $325,000, as well as an additional $7500 for defamation, and an undetermined amount in attorney's fees.  

Cochran declared bankruptcy sixteen hours before the trial was due to begin. Beagle was unable to collect the money Cochran owed, and the rights to Beagle's work were left in legal limbo. In February 2021, after a six-year battle in bankruptcy and California state courts helmed by Kathleen Hunt, and aided by James Null who coordinated the services of Loeb & Loeb's Capital Markets and Corporate practice, Beagle was able to regain rights to his intellectual property.

Bibliography

Novels and chapbooks

 A Fine and Private Place, 1960 (novel)
 The Last Unicorn, 1968 (novel)
 Lila the Werewolf, 1974 (chapbook edition of previously published novelette)
 The Fantasy Worlds of Peter S. Beagle, 1978 (omnibus collection including A Fine and Private Place, The Last Unicorn, Come Lady Death, and Lila the Werewolf)
 The Folk of the Air, 1986 (novel, currently being rewritten and expanded for new release)
 The Innkeeper's Song, 1993 (novel)
 The Unicorn Sonata, 1996 (young adult novel, currently being rewritten and expanded into a 4-book series)
 Tamsin, 1999 (novel)
 A Dance for Emilia, 2000 (hardcover giftbook edition of novella) (Illustrated by Anne Yvonne Gilbert)
 Your Friendly Neighborhood Magician: Songs and Early Poems, 2006 (limited edition chapbook collection of song lyrics and poetry) (Tachyon Publications)
 The Last Unicorn: The Lost Version, 2007 (original novella-length draft, from Subterranean Press)
 Strange Roads, 2008 (3-story chapbook collaboration with Lisa Snellings-Clark for Dreamhaven Books)
 Return, 2010 (limited edition novella chapbook, Subterranean Press)
 Two Hearts, 2011 (unpublished limited edition chapbook of Hugo Award and Nebula Award-winning novelette sequel to The Last Unicorn)
 Summerlong, 2016, Tachyon Publications
 In Calabria, February 2017 (novella)
 The Last Unicorn: The Lost Journey, November 2018 (finished version of the original The Lost Unicorn)
 The First Last Unicorn and Other Beginnings, forthcoming (unpublished story collection with additional essay material)

As editor
 Peter S. Beagle's Immortal Unicorn, 1995 (co-editor, original story anthology, split into two volumes when reprinted in paperback: Peter S. Beagle's Immortal Unicorn in 1998, and Peter S. Beagle's Immortal Unicorn 2 in 1999)
 The Secret History of Fantasy, 2010 (anthology from Tachyon Publications)
 The Urban Fantasy Anthology, 2011 (with Joe R. Lansdale)
 The New Voices of Fantasy, 2017 (with Jacob Weisman)

Short fiction 
Collections
 Giant Bones, 1997 (original stories set in the world of The Innkeeper's Song); reissued in 1999 as The Magician of Karakosk and Other Stories
 The Line Between, 2006
 We Never Talk About My Brother, 2009, Tachyon Publications
 Mirror Kingdoms: The Best of Peter S. Beagle, 2010 (Subterranean Press, edited by Jonathan Strahan)
 Sleight of Hand, 2011, Tachyon Publications
 The Overneath, 2017, Tachyon Publications

Non-fiction
 I See By My Outfit: Cross-Country by Scooter, an Adventure, 1965 (nonfiction)
 The California Feeling, 1969 (with photographer Michael Bry, nonfiction)
 American Denim, 1975 (nonfiction art book)
 The Lady and Her Tiger, 1976 (with Pat Derby, nonfiction)
 The Garden of Earthly Delights, 1982 (nonfiction art book)
 In the Presence of the Elephants, 1995 (nonfiction photo book)
 The Rhinoceros Who Quoted Nietzsche and Other Odd Acquaintances, 1997 (collection of fiction and nonfiction essays)

Audiobooks
These five audiobooks are unabridged readings by Beagle, except the first, which is abridged. Giant Bones is a collection of short fiction; the others are novels.

 The Last Unicorn, abridged (1990 cassette)
 A Fine and Private Place (2002 CD and cassette)
 Giant Bones (2002 CD & cassette)
 Tamsin (2002 CD and cassette)
 The Last Unicorn (2005 download), with original music by Jeff Slingluff

Screenplays
 The Dove, 1974
 The Greatest Thing That Almost Happened, 1977
 The Lord of the Rings, 1978
 The Last Unicorn, 1982
 "Sarek" episode of Star Trek: The Next Generation, 1990
 A Whale of a Tale, pilot episode for a TV serial adaptation of The Little Mermaid, 1992
 Camelot, 1998
 A Tale of Egypt, 1998

Discography
 Peter Beagle Live!, 1991

Awards
Source: The Locus Index to SF Awards

These are annual "best of the year" literary awards, with three exceptions (‡).
 1987   Mythopoeic Fantasy Award, The Folk of the Air
 1994   Locus Award, Fantasy Novel, The Innkeeper's Song
 2000   Mythopoeic Fantasy Award, Adult, Tamsin
 2004   Grand Prix de l'Imaginaire, Nouvelle étrangère, Le rhinocéros qui citait Nietzsche
That is, best foreign-language short fiction published July 2002 to June 2003, for the French edition (Gallimard, 2002) of The Rhinoceros Who Quoted Nietzsche and Other Odd Acquaintances (1997)
 2006 ‡ Inkpot Award (comics), Special citation
 2006   Hugo Award, Novelette, "Two Hearts"
 2007   Nebula Award, Novelette, "Two Hearts"
 2007   WSFA Small Press Award (short fiction), "El Regalo"
 2010   Locus Award, Novelette, "By Moonlight"
 2011 ‡ World Fantasy Award for Life Achievement
 2018 ‡ Damon Knight Memorial Grand Master Award

In 1987, Locus ranked The Last Unicorn number five among the 33 all-time best fantasy novels, based on a poll of subscribers.
The 1998 rendition of the poll considered many book series as single entries and ranked The Last Unicorn number 18.

References

External links

 
 
 Green Man special issue on Beagle – all Beagle's works, plus articles, audio, insider info, and poetry
 Interview by Swindle
 Sleight of Hand by Beagle at Tachyon Publications
 

1939 births
Living people
20th-century American essayists
20th-century American male writers
20th-century American novelists
20th-century American short story writers
21st-century American essayists
21st-century American male writers
21st-century American novelists
21st-century American short story writers
American fantasy writers
American male essayists
American male novelists
American male short story writers
American people of Russian-Jewish descent
The Bronx High School of Science alumni
Chapbook writers
Filkers
Hugo Award-winning writers
Inkpot Award winners
Jewish American novelists
The Magazine of Fantasy & Science Fiction people
Nebula Award winners
Novelists from New York (state)
People from the Bronx
SFWA Grand Masters
University of Pittsburgh alumni
World Fantasy Award-winning writers
Writers from California